Burnstick Lake is a summer village in Alberta, Canada. It is located on the northern shore of Burnstick Lake, in Clearwater County, south of Caroline.

Demographics 

In the 2016 Census of Population conducted by Statistics Canada, the Summer Village of Burnstick Lake originally had a population of 0 living in 0 of its 0 total private dwellings, a  change from its 2011 population of 16. Statistics Canada subsequently amended the 2016 census results for Burnstick Lake to a population of 15 living in 7 of its 57 total dwellings, a  change from its 2011 population of 16.

See also 
List of communities in Alberta
List of summer villages in Alberta
List of resort villages in Saskatchewan

References

External links 

1991 establishments in Alberta
Summer villages in Alberta